
Gmina Ciepłowody is a rural gmina (administrative district) in Ząbkowice Śląskie County, Lower Silesian Voivodeship, in south-western Poland.

Neighbouring gminas
Gmina Ciepłowody is bordered by the gminas of Kondratowice, Niemcza, Strzelin, Ząbkowice Śląskie and Ziębice.

Villages
The gmina contains the villages of Baldwinowice, Brochocin, Cienkowice, Ciepłowody, Czesławice, Dobrzenice, Jakubów, Janówka, Karczowice, Kobyla Głowa, Muszkowice, Piotrowice Polskie, Stary Henryków, Targowica, Tomice and Wilamowice.

References

Cieplowody
Ząbkowice Śląskie County